Cumberland River may refer to:

 Cumberland River
 Cumberland River (Victoria)
 Cumberland River (St. Vincent)
 Cumberland River (Georgia)

See also 
 Cumberland (disambiguation)